Copper(II) aspirinate is an aspirin chelate of copper(II) cations (Cu2+). It is used to treat rheumatoid arthritis.

Preparation
Copper aspirinate can be prepared by several methods. In one route of preparation, an excess of acetylsalicylic acid is dissolved in aqueous sodium carbonate. Sodium hydroxide is not suitable for this purpose, because it will hydrolyse acetylsalicylic acid (ASA) into salicylic acid and sodium acetate.

2 HC9H7O4 + Na2CO3 → 2 NaC9H7O4 + CO2↑ + H2O

The resulting solution is then filtered to remove any undissolved acetylsalicylic acid and is mixed with a solution containing Cu2+ cations (copper(II) sulfate is suitable), precipitating bright blue crystals of copper aspirinate immediately. The crystals can then be filtered from solution, washed, and dried. An excess of acetylsalicylic acid is used in the first step, because it eliminates the possibility of unreacted carbonate anions precipitating the copper in this step.

4 NaC9H7O4 + 2 CuSO4 → C36H28Cu2O16↓ + 2 Na2SO4

Medicinal use
Copper aspirinate has been proven effective as a treatment for rheumatoid arthritis. A pharmacokinetic study in healthy human volunteers supports its enhanced efficacy as compared with aspirin. 
The studies on animal models suggest that copper aspirinate is very promising in treating against thrombotic diseases and it has all the prospects of success in becoming an antithrombotic drug that prevents and treats thrombotic diseases in humans.

Other uses
The use of copper aspirinate as a pigment in PVC and polystyrene has also been investigated.

External links
IR Spectrum from Eckerd College's Chem Department

Footnotes

Copper(II) compounds
Acetylsalicylic acids
Salicylates